Propaganda in the Republic of China has been an important tool since its inception with the Xinhai Revolution in 1912. The term xuanchuan ( "propaganda; publicity") can have either a neutral connotation in official government contexts or a pejorative connotation in informal contexts. Some xuanchuan collocations usually refer to "propaganda" (e.g., xuānchuánzhàn 宣傳戰 "propaganda war"), others to "publicity" (xuānchuán méijiè 宣傳媒介 "mass media; means of publicity"), and still others are ambiguous (xuānchuányuán 宣傳員 "propagandist; publicist"). It also was an important tool in legitimizing the Kuomintang controlled Republic of China government that retreated from Mainland China to Taiwan in 1949.

Themes

Patriotism

Because the national government of the time was weak, it was difficult for any censorship or propagandistic measures to be carried out effectively. However, a bureau was set up to control the production and the release of film in China. Also, newspapers unfavorable to the central government could be harassed at will. After the Northern Expedition, the power of the central government increased significantly, and propaganda campaigns became more effective. Propaganda was produced with different patriotic themes, such as Chinese nationalism.

Second Sino-Japanese War

The Republic of China produced propaganda against Japan during the Second Sino-Japanese War to booster morale and bolden resistance to the invasion. More was produced during the Chinese Civil War.

Anti-communism

In Mainland China

During the Chinese Civil War, propaganda against the Communist Party of China was extensively used.

Chiang Kai-shek attacked the CPC in 1943 with the propaganda piece China's Destiny, which questioned the CPC's power after the war, and the CPC strongly opposed Chiang's leadership and referred to his regime as fascist in an attempt to generate a negative public image.

In Taiwan

One of the main tools for disseminating propaganda in Taiwan has been the Government Information Office and the various media properties controlled by the Kuomintang and the government.  Besides controlling commercial television and radio stations, a police radio station often broadcast "educational" plays with propagandistic value and a film bureau. After the Kuomintang fled to Taiwan, propaganda through public education in Taiwan was an important tool in creating a Chinese national identity among Taiwanese and preparing the people for "a counter-offensive" against the PRC. Although the government is now democratic, the legacy of authoritarian rule has created a confusion of identity in Taiwan, both with many adults having grown up thinking that the ROC would launch a "counter-offensive" against the PRC and with Mandarin becoming the most common language. Previously, the people had been educated in the evils of the Communists and the good of the Nationalists, with many Taiwanese remembering lore taught in elementary school on the wisdom of Chiang Kai-shek.

The Kuomintang also published numerous publications after its retreat to Taiwan, including the Free China Journal.  Its popularity soared, as the editors and writers analyzed political situations at the time and sometimes even advised or criticized the government in earnest.

Occasionally, the ROC has attempted to spread propaganda into PRC-controlled areas, usually in the form of leaflet drops over coastal provinces that call for the locals to rebel against CPC rule and are accompanied by the promise that the ROC will one day liberate the mainland. That proved to be ineffective and after several years was largely discontinued.

The Government Information Office was replaced after democratization with the National Communications Commission, an agency styled after the FCC, in the United States. Most of today's films in Taiwan are Hollywood movies, and all theaters are commercially-run for-profit enterprises. Some activities of the Taiwanese government have been described as propaganda. Much of it has been directed against Mainland China's People's Republic of China.

Media

Films

In the Republic of China, movies were created even during wartime, such as Mulan Joins the Army (1939) with its story of a young Chinese peasant fighting against a foreign invasion, and Children of Troubled Times (1935), a patriotic Chinese film about the Japanese invasion of China, and known for being the origin of the "March of the Volunteers", now the national anthem of the People's Republic of China.

Patriotic songs

Several songs written in the Republic of China had patriotic messages. Some, such as 800 Heroes Song, Guerrillas' Song, and The Sword March, were written during the Second Sino-Japanese War, and others, such as Go and Reclaim the Mainland and The Anti-Communist and Anti-Russian Aggression Song, were written with anti-communist messages.

See also
Cross-Strait war of propaganda
Cinema of China
Propaganda in the People's Republic of China
Voice of Free China
Radio Taiwan International

References

	
Propaganda in China
 
Mass media in Taiwan
Kuomintang
Taiwan